Ebelio Agustín Ordóñez Martínez (born November 3, 1973) is an Ecuadorian former professional footballer who played as a striker.

Club career
Ordoñez was born in Esmeraldas. He started playing professionally for 9 de Octubre. He spent about a year playing there and already got interest from many teams because of his versatile position. He was sold to Panamá in the 1994 season. For the next season he moved to play to Tecnico Universitario, where he had a solid campaign scoring 7 goals. He was sold El Nacional becoming one of the best center forwards in Ecuador, scoring more than 70 goals with los puros criollos. He then moved to Emelec, where he had few minutes and he did not scored either. After that frustrating campaign he moved to Deportivo Quito, and helped the team win its first championship in 60 years, scoring 2 goals in 25 matches.

International career
Ordoñez has played for the Ecuador national football team since 1996, appearing in 19 matches, debuting against Costa Rica. He has played in the 2001 and 2004 Copa America and several games in the FIFA World Cup qualifying rounds for 1998, 2002 and 2006.

Honors
Deportivo Quito
Serie A: 2008

References

External links
Ordóñez's FEF player card 

1973 births
Living people
Sportspeople from Esmeraldas, Ecuador
Association football forwards
Ecuadorian footballers
Ecuador international footballers
2001 Copa América players
2004 Copa América players
C.D. Técnico Universitario footballers
C.D. El Nacional footballers
Pudong Zobon players
C.S. Emelec footballers
S.D. Quito footballers
Club Olimpia footballers
S.D. Aucas footballers
Ecuadorian expatriate footballers
Expatriate footballers in Paraguay
Expatriate footballers in China
Ecuadorian Serie A players
Paraguayan Primera División players
China League One players